Strathearn Community Campus is a complex including the replacement building for the original Crieff High School in Crieff, Scotland.  This, one of the eleven secondary schools administered by Perth & Kinross Council, is a six-year comprehensive school offering a full range of courses leading to national certification from the Scottish Qualification Authority.

Strathearn Community Campus also acts as a community centre for the local public, and includes the public library, which moved from its old premises in the centre of town to the site.  Also present is what was the Strathearn Recreation Centre, now integrated into the campus, with the fitness gym moved to a larger room in the campus, with new equipment. The campus's outdoor grass, clay and astroturf pitches are all available for public use out of school time.

The campus has two large three court PE halls, a moderately sized swimming pool, two squash courts, a large dance theatre and a cinema style assembly hall capable of Blu-ray projection and theatre style drama productions.

The campus is situated on the south-eastern edge of Crieff with outlooks across the town to the mountains of the north and west and across the rich farmland of lower Strathearn to the south and east.

Pupils transfer each year from the associated primary schools of Crieff, Muthill, Braco, Madderty, Greenloaning and Comrie. It also welcomes a consistent intake of pupils from St Dominic's RC Primary School. All Primary 7 pupils from the associated primaries visit the campus for two induction days in June and they also receive visits to their own school from Senior Management and Guidance staff of Strathearn Community Campus.

External links 
 
  School website

Secondary schools in Perth and Kinross
Crieff